The following is a list of notable events that have happened in 2013 in music in Australia.

Events

January
The 2013 Big Day Out music festival was held in Sydney, Melbourne, Perth, Adelaide and the Gold Coast, headlined by Red Hot Chili Peppers and the Killers.

February
Laneway was a sold out music festival in Sydney in early February.

March
 The 2013 Future Music Festival took place in March in various locations around Australia. There were 39 Australian and international artists who performed.

April

May

June

July
The Splendour in the Grass is an annual music festival that began in late July and ended in early August. The 2013 edition of the festival was held at Belongil Fields, and featured rock, hip hop, alternative, and electronic music, headlined by Mumford & Sons, The National and Lorde (the latter replacing cancelled headliner Frank Ocean).

August

September
Defqon.1 Festival took place on September 14 in Sydney.

October
On 28 October 2013, season five of The X Factor Australia ended. It was announced that Dami Im was the winner. The runner-up was Taylor Henderson.

November

December
ARIA Music Awards of 2013 was a series award ceremonies that honored musical artists and groups.

Bands disbanded
 Hungry Kids of Hungary

Albums and singles

January

February
Push the Sky Away was released on 18 February 2013. The album was released by the alternative rock band Nick Cave and the Bad Seeds. The album peaked number 1 on many charts including Australian ARIA Albums Chart, Austrian Ö3 Albums Chart, and Belgian Albums Chart (Flanders)
Hillsong United released their third studio album Zion on 22 February.

March
The Drones' studio album I See Seaweed was released.

April

May

June
Empire of the Sun's second album Ice on the Dune was released on 14 June 2013 in Australia.

July
Hillsong Church's live album Glorious Ruins was released on 2 July.
Violent Soho's single In The Aisle was released on 8 July 2013. This was the first single of the album Hungry Ghost.

August

September
Hillsong United released their EP Oceans on 10 September 2013.

October
We Are Young & Free was released on 1 October 2013. The album contained the singles Alive, Wake, and "Vivo Estás".
The album, Zion Acoustic Sessions'', was released by Hillsong United on 29 October.
Dami Im's single Alive was released on 28 October 2013. The single ranked number 1 on the ARIA charts upon its release.

November

December

2013 Australian music charts

Triple J Hottest 100

2013 AIR charts
Winners below for the 2013 Carlton Dry Independent music awards:

Best Independent Artist  – Flume
Best Independent Album – Flume – Flume
Breakthrough Independent Artist - Vance Joy
Best Independent Single/EP  - Vance Joy – God Loves You When You’re Dancing
Best Independent Hip Hop Album – Seth Sentry – This Was Tomorrow
Best Independent Country Album – Catherine Britt – Always Never Enough
Best Independent Blues And Roots Album – Paul Kelly – Spring And Fall
Best Independent Hard Rock, Heavy or Punk Album – King Gizzard & the Lizard Wizard – 12 Bar Bruise
Best Independent Jazz Album – Jonathan Zwartz – The Remembering And Forgetting Of The Air
Best Independent Dance/Electronica Album – Flume – Flume
Best Independent Dance/Electronica or Club Single – Flume – Holdin’ On
Best Independent Classical Album  – Amy Dickson – Catch Me If You Can
Best Independent Label – Future Classic
Carlton Dry Global Music Grant winner – King Gizzard & The Lizard Wizard

Deaths
11 February – Kevin Peek, Australian guitarist (Sky) (b. 1946)
15 May – Albert Lance, Australian-French tenor and actor (b. 1925)
21 June – Wendy Saddington, Australian singer (Chain) (b. 1949)
1 July - Gary Shearston, Australian singer-songwriter (b. 1939)
31 July - Helen Quach, Vietnamese-born orchestral conductor (b. 1940)

See also
List of number-one singles of 2013 (Australia)
List of number-one albums of 2013 (Australia)
2013 in music
2013 in Australia
List of Australian music festivals

References

 
Australian music
Australia